Delicias may refer to:

 Delicias Municipality, Mexico
 Delicias, Chihuahua, a city in Mexico
 Delicias, Táchira, a town in Venezuela
 Delicias (Madrid Metro), in Madrid's downtown
 Delicias railway station, in Arganzuela, Madrid, Spain.
 Madrid-Delicias station, now a railway museum.
 Zaragoza–Delicias railway station, in Zaragoza, Aragon, Spain
 Delicias, a district of Upala canton, Alajuela province, Costa Rica.

See also
 Las Delicias (disambiguation)